Katsbaan is a hamlet of the town of Saugerties in Ulster County, New York, United States,  located north of the village of Saugerties and south of Catskill.

The hamlet existed at least as far back as the American Revolution. The origin of the name, which means "tennis court", is possibly linked to the original Dutch visitors to the area who saw lacrosse being played by native Iroquois which they thought resembled tennis.

The hamlet was settled by Dutch farmers and German Palatines prior to 1730, and was deeded to the Dutch Reformed Church by 1732. A stone church that was constructed at that time was used as a landmark on Colonial American maps, and still stands today.

References

Hamlets in Ulster County, New York
Saugerties, New York